The St Aubyn Centre is a mental health facility at 216 Turner Road, Colchester, Essex. It has two wards: (i) Longview Ward which is a General Adolescent unit which provides care and treatment for young people with mental health difficulties between the ages of 13 and 18 and (ii) Larkwood Ward which is a Psychiatric Intensive Care Unit (PICU) caring for children of the same age group. Larkwood is the only Psychiatric Intensive Care Unit in the NHS East of England region for young people.

See also
 Healthcare in Essex
 List of hospitals in England

References

External links
 Mid and North Essex Mind

Psychiatric hospitals in England
Hospitals in Essex